2018 Thespakusatsu Gunma season.

J3 League

References

External links
 J.League official site

Thespakusatsu Gunma
Thespakusatsu Gunma seasons